Spiraea × cinerea is a species of flowering plant in the rose family. It is a hybrid of garden origin (S. hypericifolia × S. cana).

The Latin specific epithet cinerea means “the colour of ash”.

The cultivar ‘Grefsheim’ is widely grown as a garden plant. It has gained the Royal Horticultural Society’s Award of Garden Merit.

References 

Hybrid plants
Spiraea